Elisa Spiropali (born 15 March 1983) is an Albanian politician who is currently serving as the Minister of State for Relations with Parliament in the Rama II Cabinet.

Early life 
Elisa Spiropali was born on 15 March, 1983 in Tirana. She attended the Qemal Stafa Gymnasium where she earned a scholarship from the United World Colleges as one of the top five high school students in Albania and later received a diploma at the Lester B. Pearson College in Vancouver Island, Canada. She continued her education by enrolling at the Mount Holyoke College in Massachusetts, United States where she graduated in 2005 with an honorary degree in two branches, Politics and Economics. Elisa has travelled and studied merit scholarships to countries such as Argentina and the United Kingdom, experiences she considers invaluable in her academic formation.

She has given lectures in several private universities in Albania and has been a leader in youth organizations such as MJAFT!.

Political career 
Spiropali started her political career in 2009. After becoming a member of the Socialist Party, she was appointed for a brief time as Director General of Customs and later as a spokeswoman for the Party Presidency. She was elected as member of the Albanian Parliament following the 2013 General Elections. On 17 January 2019, she resumed the vacant post of Minister of State for Relations with the Parliament which had previously been held by Ermonela Felaj.

Personal life 
Ms. Spiropali is married and has a young daughter, Nalta.

References 

Government ministers of Albania
Women government ministers of Albania
Members of the Parliament of Albania
Women members of the Parliament of Albania
Socialist Party of Albania politicians
Customs directors of Albania
21st-century Albanian politicians
21st-century Albanian women politicians
Mount Holyoke College alumni
1983 births
Living people